Baz is a village and a former municipality in the Dibër County, northern Albania. At the 2015 local government reform it became a subdivision of the municipality Mat. The population at the 2011 census was 2,228.

Demographic history
Baz (Bazëda) is recorded in the Ottoman defter of 1467 as a settlement belonging to the timar of the local Albanians Kali Gjergji, Gjonima, Gjergji, and Todori in the vilayet of Mati. The village had a total of six households represented by the following household heads: Andrija Kimiza, Uksiç Bardi, Lazar Muzaka, Tole Skura, Peber Kimiza, and Kaznish Bardi.

References

Former municipalities in Dibër County
Administrative units of Mat (municipality)
Villages in Dibër County